Taurianova is a comune (municipality) in the Province of Reggio Calabria in the southern Italian region Calabria, located about  southwest of Catanzaro and about  northeast of Reggio Calabria.
 

It was the site of the Italic city of Tauriana, a former Catholic bishopric, which was nominally restored as titular see Tauriano.

Taurianova borders the municipalities Cittanova, Molochio, Oppido Mamertina, Rizziconi, Terranova Sappo Minulio and Varapodio.

The municipality of Taurianova contains the frazioni (subdivisions, mainly villages and hamlets) San Martino, Amato, Pegara and Donna Livia.

Taurianova is famous for handmade nougat.

Taurianova was the location of a bloody’ndrangheta war in 1991. 8 people were murdered in 3 days in May 1991 and one victim had his head cut off in front of his own butcher shop.

Demographic evolution

References 

https://apnews.com/article/dd93c8321e3ac61e34d7aaa8a9cc23b0

External links 
 www.comune.taurianova.rc.it/

Cities and towns in Calabria